Dhoon (Tune or Passion) is a 1953 Bollywood film directed by M. Kumar. The film was produced by Silver Kings, a production company formed by Kumar and his then wife, actress Pramila. The film stars Raj Kapoor, Nargis, Motilal, Kumar, Pramila, E. Bilmoria, Leela Mishra and Kamal Mehra. Mehra was a lesser known comedian who started his career in 1951 with Naujawan. He went on to act in several films before starting his own production company Pride Of India under which he made films like Kismat (1968), Mahal (1969) and Naami Chor (1977).  The music was composed by Madan Mohan.

Cast
 Raj Kapoor as Raj
 Nargis as Kamini
 Motilal

Soundtrack
The music director was Madan Mohan. The film had three lyricists, Kaif Irfani, Pyarelal Santoshi and Bharat Vyas. The playback singing was by Lata Mangeshkar, Mohammed Rafi, Hemant Kumar, Rajkumari and Zohrabai Ambalewali.

Songlist

References

External links
 

1953 films
1950s Hindi-language films
Indian romantic drama films
1953 romantic drama films
Indian black-and-white films